is an anime series adapted from the manga of the same title written and illustrated by Yasuhisa Hara. The series was adapted into a two-season, seventy-seven episode anime series by studio Pierrot. The first season of thirty-eight episodes aired from June 4, 2012 to February 25, 2013. It follows the manga up to volume 16 chapter 173. A second season was announced, and aired thirty-nine episodes from June 8, 2013 to March 1, 2014. The second season continues the manga, from volume 17 chapter 174 to volume 24 chapter 260. An English language release of the anime was licensed by Funimation Entertainment. A third season has been announced, and aired from April 6, 2020 to October 18, 2021. On April 26, 2020, the anime production committee announced that Episode 5 and onwards of the third series would be indefinitely postponed by the COVID-19 pandemic. On October 5, 2020, it was announced that the broadcast of Episode 5 and onward will resume in May 2021. At the end of the third season's final episode, a fourth season was announced, and aired from April 10 to October 2, 2022. A fifth season was announced at the end of the fourth season, and is set to premiere in January 2024.

Series overview

Episode list

Season 1 (2012–13)

Season 2 (2013–14)

Season 3 (2020–21)

Season 4 (2022)

Notes

References

Kingdom
Kingdom episode lists